Rosie and the Goldbug was the eponymous debut album by Rosie and the Goldbug, released on September 15, 2008, on the band manager's label, Lover Records. It was produced by Jim Eliot of electropop duo Kish Mauve and mixed by Dave Bascombe.

The album contains a number of tracks co-written with other artists, including Marcella Detroit, formerly of Shakespear's Sister, Dante Gizzi and Giuliano Gizzi of the Glasgow bands El Presidente and Gun and Ashley Pope from UK dance duo NAPT.

It was to remain the band's only album; the band broke up in 2009. Singer/keyboardist Rosie Vanier has gone on to start a solo project.

Track listing

References

External links 
 Price, Simon (2008-10-05). Album: Rosie and the Goldbug, Rosie and the Goldbug (Lover), Review in The Independent

2008 debut albums
Albums produced by Jim Eliot